Dynamo Stadium is a multi-purpose stadium in Ufa, Russia.  It is currently used mostly for football matches and was the home stadium of FC Ufa prior to their move to Neftyanik Stadium.  The stadium has enough seats for 5,808 people.

External links
Stadium information

Football venues in Russia
Multi-purpose stadiums in Russia
Sport in Ufa